Rastislav or Rostyslav is a male Slavic given name, meaning "to increase glory" . The name has been used by several notable people of Russian, Polish, Ukrainian, Serbian, Czech  and Slovak backgrounds.

Old Slavonic, Serbian, Slovak, Slovenian: Rastislav
Bulgarian, Russian: Ростислав (Rostislav), Czech: Rostislav
Ukrainian: Rostyslav
Belarusian: Raścisłaŭ (roughly pronounced: Ras'''-tsi-slaw)
Polish: Rościsław (roughly pronounced: Rosh-chi-swaf)

Name Day
Czech: 19 AprilSlovene: 10 MarchSlovak: 13 JanuaryPolish: 17 JanuaryUkrainian 27 MarchDerivatives and nicknamesRostia, Rostek, Rastko, Rastio, Rasty, Rosty, Rostic, Rosko, Rostko, Rastík, Rasťo, Slava, Slavik, Rasti, Ross, RostykList of people with the given name Rostyslav, Rostislav or Rastislav
Royalty
Rastislav of Moravia, second ruler of Great Moravia 846–870
Rostyslav of Tmutarakan (d. 1066) 
Rostyslav Vsevolodovych, Prince of Pereyaslavl 1078-1093 
Rostyslav I of Kyiv, (Rostyslav Mstyslavych), Grand Prince of Kyiv from 1154–1167, with intervals
Rostyslav II of Kyiv, (Rostyslav Ryurikovich), Grand Prince of Kyiv from 1204–1206
Rostyslav III of Kyiv (Rostyslav Mykhaylovych or Rostyslav of Slavonia), Grand Prince of Kyiv in 1239
Rastislav Nemanjić (Rastko''), Grand Prince of Hum 1190-1192, Serb Archbishop 1217-1235
Rastislalić family, 14th-century Serbian noble family
Prince Rostislav Alexandrovich of Russia (1902-1978)

Others
Rastislav Beličák, Slovak footballer
Rostislav Goldshteyn, Russian politician
Rastislav Kužel, Slovak sprint canoeist
Rastislav Michalík, Slovak footballer
Rastislav Staňa, Slovak professional ice hockey goaltender
Rastislav Špirko, Slovak hockey player
Rastislav Dej, Slovak hockey player
Milan Rastislav Štefánik, Slovak politician, diplomat, and astronomer
Rostislav Olesz, Czech hockey player
Rostislav Stratimirovic, Bulgarian rebel leader
Rostislav Vojáček, ex-Czechoslovak footballer
Rostislav Čtvrtlík, Czech actor
Rościsław Żerelik, Polish historian
Rastislav (Gont), Eastern Orthodox bishop
Rastko Petrović, Serbian poet and writer

References 

Belarusian masculine given names
Bulgarian masculine given names
Czech masculine given names
Slovak masculine given names
Polish masculine given names
Russian masculine given names
Ukrainian masculine given names
Slovene masculine given names
Croatian masculine given names
Slavic masculine given names